The 2017 FEU Tamaraws Men's Basketball Team represents Far Eastern University during the University Athletic Association of the Philippines' 80th season in men's basketball division. The Tamaraws are led by their rookie head coach Olsen Racela who replaced his brother Nash, who took over professional team TNT KaTropa in the Philippine Basketball Association.

The Tamaraws are looking to reclaim the crown this season as they parade an experienced lineup led by ex-Ateneo Blue Eagles Hubert Cani, Arvin Tolentino and Filipino-American Jasper Parker.

Current roster

Team Depth Chart

Schedule

|-
!colspan=12 style="background:#006400; color:#FFD700;"| UAAP Season 80 First Round

Player stats

Statistics by PBA-Online.net

References

FEU Tamaraws basketball seasons
Tam